The mayor of New York City, officially Mayor of the City of New York, is head of the executive branch of the government of New York City and the chief executive of New York City. The mayor's office administers all city services, public property, police and fire protection, most public agencies, and enforces all city and state laws within New York City.

The budget, overseen by New York City Mayor's Office of Management and Budget, is the largest municipal budget in the United States, totaling $100.7 billion in fiscal year 2021. The City employs 325,000 people, spends about $21 billion to educate more than 1.1 million students (the largest public school system in the United States), and levies $27 billion in taxes. It receives $14 billion from the state and federal governments.

The mayor's office is located in New York City Hall; it has jurisdiction over all five boroughs of New York City: Manhattan, Brooklyn, the Bronx, Staten Island and Queens. The mayor appoints numerous officials, including deputy mayors and the commissioners who head city agencies and departments. The mayor's regulations are compiled in title 43 of the New York City Rules. According to current law, the mayor is limited to two consecutive four-year terms in office but may run again after a four-year break. The limit on consecutive terms was changed from two to three on October 23, 2008, when the New York City Council voted 29–22 in favor of passing the term limit extension into law. However, in 2010, a referendum reverting the limit to two terms passed overwhelmingly.

The current mayor is Eric Adams, who was elected on November 2, 2021, and took office shortly after midnight on January 1, 2022.

History 

In 1665, Governor Richard Nicolls appointed Thomas Willett as the first mayor of New York. For 156 years, the mayor was appointed and had limited power. Between 1783 and 1821 the mayor was appointed by the Council of Appointment in which the state's governor had the loudest voice. In 1821 the Common Council, which included elected members, gained the authority to choose the mayor. An amendment to the New York State Constitution in 1834 provided for the direct popular election of the mayor. Cornelius W. Lawrence, a Democrat, was elected that year.

Gracie Mansion has been the official residence of the mayor since Fiorello La Guardia's administration in 1942. Its main floor is open to the public and serves as a small museum.

The mayor is entitled to a salary of $258,750 a year. Michael Bloomberg, mayor of the city from 2002 to 2013 and one of the richest people in the world, declined the salary and instead was paid $1 yearly.

In 2000 direct control of the city's public school system was transferred to the mayor's office. In 2003 the reorganization established the New York City Department of Education.

Tammany Hall 

Tammany Hall, which evolved from an organization of craftsmen into a Democratic political machine, gained control of Democratic Party nominations in the state and city in 1861. It played a major role in New York City politics into the 1960s and was a dominant player from the mayoral victory of Fernando Wood in 1854 through the era of Robert Wagner (1954–1965). Its last political leader was an African American man named J. Raymond Jones.

Deputies 
The mayor of New York City may appoint several deputy mayors to help oversee major offices within the executive branch of the city government. The powers and duties, and even the number of deputy mayors, are not defined by the City Charter.

The post was created by Fiorello La Guardia (who appointed Grover Whalen as deputy mayor) to handle ceremonial events that the mayor was too busy to attend. Since then, deputy mayors have been appointed with their areas of responsibility defined by the appointing mayor. There are currently five deputy mayors, all of whom report directly to the mayor. The majority of agency commissioners and department heads report to one of the deputy mayors, giving the role a great deal of power within a mayoral administration.

Deputy mayors do not have any right to succeed to the mayoralty in the case of vacancy or incapacity of the mayor. (The order of succession is the Public Advocate of the City of New York, then the Comptroller of the City of New York.)

Current deputy mayors 
 Sheena Wright, First Deputy Mayor
 Advises the mayor on citywide administrative, operational and policy matters.

 Maria Torres-Springer, Deputy Mayor for Housing and Economic Development
 Oversees and coordinates the operations of the Economic Development Corporation, the Department of Transportation, the Department of Buildings, the Department of City Planning, Department of Housing Preservation and Development, New York City Housing Development Corporation and related agencies.

 Anne Williams-Isom, Deputy Mayor for Health and Human Services
 Oversees and coordinates the operations of the Human Resources Administration, Department of Homeless Services, the Administration for Children's Services, New York City Health and Hospitals, and related agencies.

 Meera Joshi, Deputy Mayor for Operations
Phil Banks, Deputy Mayor for Public Safety

Notable former deputy mayors

Under Bill de Blasio 

 Emma Wolfe 2020–2021
 Dean Fuleihan 2018–2021
 Anthony Shorris 2014–2017
 Vicki Been 2019–2021
 Herminia Palacio 2016–2019
 Lilliam Barrios-Paoli 2014–2016

Under Michael Bloomberg 

 Patricia Harris 2001–2013
 Stephen Goldsmith 2010–2011
 Daniel L. Doctoroff 2002–2008
 Robert K. Steel 2010–2013
 Dennis M. Walcott
 Howard Wolfson

Previous administrations 
 Joe Lhota—under Rudolph Giuliani
Kenneth Lipper—under Ed Koch
 William Lynch the 1990–1992—under David Dinkins
Barry F. Sullivan 1992–1994—under David Dinkins
 Basil Paterson 1978—under Ed Koch
 Herman Badillo 1977–1979—under Ed Koch
 Robert W. Sweet 1966–1969—under John Lindsay

Offices appointed 

"The mayor has the power to appoint and remove the commissioners of more than 40 city agencies and members of City boards and commissions." These include:

New York City Police Commissioner
New York City Fire Commissioner
New York City Criminal Court judges
New York City Marshals
New York City Schools Chancellor (as of 2002)
New York City Mayor's Office of Management and Budget
Commissioner of Health of the City of New York

Board member 
The mayor of New York City is an ex-officio board member of the following organizations:

American Museum of Natural History
Brooklyn Academy of Music
Brooklyn Botanic Garden
Brooklyn Children's Museum
Brooklyn Museum of Art
Brooklyn Public Library
Carnegie Hall
El Museo del Barrio
Lincoln Center for the Performing Arts
Metropolitan Museum of Art
Museum of Jewish Heritage
Museum of the City of New York
National September 11 Memorial & Museum
New York Botanical Garden
New York Hall of Science
New York Public Library
New York Shakespeare Festival
Public Design Commission
Queens Borough Public Library
Queens Botanical Garden
Queens Museum of Art
Snug Harbor Cultural Center
Staten Island Botanical Garden
Staten Island Children's Museum
Staten Island Historical Society
Staten Island Institute of Arts and Sciences
Staten Island Zoo
Wave Hill
Wildlife Conservation Society

Commentary 

The New York City mayoralty has become known as the "second toughest job in America." It has been observed that politicians are rarely elected to any higher office after serving as mayor of New York City; the last mayor who later achieved higher office was John T. Hoffman, who became governor of New York in 1869. Former mayor Ed Koch said that the post was jinxed due to divine intervention, whereas Michael Bloomberg has called the supposed curse "a statistical fluke."

In popular culture 

Local tabloid newspapers often refer to the mayor as "Hizzoner", a corruption of the honorific style His Honor.

Spin City, a 1990s TV sitcom, starred Michael J. Fox as a deputy mayor of New York under Barry Bostwick's fictional Mayor Randall Winston.

Several mayors have appeared in television and movies, as well as on Broadway, most notably in The Will Rogers Follies. In the 1980s and 1990s, mayors Ed Koch and Rudy Giuliani appeared on Saturday Night Live on several occasions, sometimes mocking themselves in sketches. Giuliani and Mayor Michael Bloomberg have both appeared, as themselves in their mayoral capacities, on episodes of Law & Order. Giuliani also appeared as himself in an episode of Seinfeld, titled "The Non-Fat Yogurt". Giuliani has made cameos in films such as The Out-of-Towners and Anger Management. Bloomberg has appeared on 30 Rock, Gossip Girl, Curb Your Enthusiasm and Horace and Pete.

See also 

 List of mayors of New York City
 New York City mayoral elections (since 1897)
 Borough president
 Government of New York City
 History of New York City
 New York City Council
 New York City Public Advocate
 New York City Comptroller
 New York City Board of Estimate (1897–1990)
 New York City Civil Court
 New York City Criminal Court
 New York City: the 51st State

References

External links 
 
 Mayor in the Rules of the City of New York

 
1665 establishments in the Province of New York